Danielle Montalbano (born January 23, 1989) is an American-born former figure skater who competed for Israel. As a single skater, she is the 2014 Israeli national champion and 2014 Toruń Cup silver medalist. From 2009 to 2012, Montalbano competed in pair skating with partner Evgeni Krasnopolski. They medaled at four international events, including at the Golden Spin of Zagreb and Ice Challenge.

Personal life 
Danielle Montalbano was born on January 23, 1989, in Manhasset, New York. On May 19, 2015, it was announced that she was engaged to boyfriend and figure skater, Michal Brezina. Danielle and Michal married on June 10, 2017, at The Royalton with family and friends.

Career 
In 2009, Montalbano teamed up with Evgeni Krasnopolski to compete in pairs. She dislocated her shoulder in practice at the 2011 European Championships, resulting in the pair withdrawing from the event. She broke her ankle in November 2012 while practicing a twist lift – leading to two surgeries, seven screws and a plate – and began rehab after six months. Montalbano and Krasnopolski were coached by Kyoko Ina. Their partnership ended in 2013.

In 2013, Montalbano began competing in ladies' singles. The screws and plate were removed from her ankle following the 2013 Nebelhorn Trophy. She won the 2014 Israeli national title and silver at the Toruń Cup. Montalbano was assigned to the 2014 European Championships, where she placed 35th. She then went to Ellenton, Florida, to train with a partner but broke her patella, putting her in a cast for a month. She teamed up with German pair skater Konrad Hocker-Scholler after a tryout in Oberstdorf.

Montalbano announced her retirement from competitive figure skating on September 10, 2015.

Programs

Single skating

Pair skating

Competitive highlights

Single skating

Pair skating with Krasnopolski 
GP: Grand Prix

References

External links 

 
 

Israeli female pair skaters
Israeli female single skaters
1989 births
Living people
People from Manhasset, New York
Sportspeople from Hackensack, New Jersey